Byron William Humphrey (June 17, 1911 – February 13, 1992) was a relief pitcher in Major League Baseball who played briefly for the Boston Red Sox during the 1938 season. (82 k), Humphrey batted and threw right-handed. He was born in Vienna, Missouri.

Humphrey posted a 9.00 earned run average in two relief appearances, allowing two runs on five hits and one walk without strikeouts in two innings of work. He did not have a decision.

Humphrey died in Springfield, Missouri, at the age of 80.

External links
Baseball Reference (MLB)
Baseball Reference (MiLB)
Retrosheet
SABR Biography
 

1911 births
1992 deaths
Baltimore Orioles scouts
Baseball players from Missouri
Boston Red Sox players
Charlotte Hornets (baseball) players
Joplin Miners players
Little Rock Travelers players
Los Angeles Angels (minor league) players
Major League Baseball pitchers
Muskogee Chiefs players
People from Vienna, Missouri
Sportspeople from Springfield, Missouri
San Diego Padres (minor league) players
Tulsa Oilers (baseball) players